Groove Family Cyco / Snapped Lika Mutha is the third album by Infectious Grooves, a 1994 concept record about a family of crazy people (the 'Cycos'). The "Violent & Funky" music video appeared in Beavis and Butt-head.

Music and lyrics 

"Do What I Tell Ya!" criticizes the band Rage Against the Machine, who are well known for expressing anti-corporate, left-wing politics in their lyrics, but are signed with Epic Records, a subsidiary of Sony, a Japanese multinational conglomerate corporation. Mike Muir later stated that Rage Against the Machine's guitarist, Tom Morello, provoked the feud by attacking Suicidal Tendencies. The song was written in 4/4, and takes a straight rock music approach, while the rest of the album combines elements of hard rock, funk and punk rock.

Track listing 
 "Violent & Funky" (Muir, Pleasants, Siegel, Trujillo) – 4:19
 "Boom Boom Boom" (Muir, Pleasants, Siegel, Trujillo) – 4:07
 "Frustrated Again" (Muir, Trujillo) – 2:59
 "Rules Go Out the Window" (Muir, Pleasants) – 4:27
 "Groove Family Cyco" (Muir) – 4:19
 "Die Lika Pig" (Muir, Siegel, Trujillo)– 3:14
 "Do What I Tell Ya!" (Muir, Siegel) – 4:57
 "Cousin Randy" (Muir, Trujillo) – 5:39
 "Why?" (Muir, Siegel) – 4:00
 "Made It" (Muir, Pleasants, Trujillo) – 4:32

Credits 

Band
 Mike Muir - Vocals
 Robert Trujillo - Bass
 Dean Pleasants - Guitar
 Adam Siegel - Guitar, Artwork
 Brooks Wackerman - Drums
 Chris Cuffaro - Photography
 Dhogcru - Executive Producer
 Zimbo - Art Direction
 Michael Vail Blum - Producer, Engineer
 Paul Northfield - Mixing

Charts

References

1994 albums
Infectious Grooves albums